Donald J. Allard (April 21, 1936 – May 4, 2002) was an American college and professional football quarterback selected by the Washington Redskins in the first round of the 1959 NFL Draft.

He played college football at Boston College, and played professionally in the American Football League for the New York Titans in 1961 and the Boston Patriots in 1962, in the Canadian Football League for the Saskatchewan Roughriders from 1959 to 1960 and the Montreal Alouettes from 1961 to 1962, and in the Atlantic Coast Football League with the Boston/New Bedford Sweepers from 1964 to 1965. He was the highest-drafted Boston College Eagles football player in school history until Matt Ryan in 2008.

See also
 List of American Football League players

References

External links
 Don Allard at pro-football-reference.com

1936 births
2002 deaths
American football quarterbacks
Boston College Eagles football players
Boston Patriots players
Canadian football quarterbacks
Montreal Alouettes players
New York Titans (AFL) players
Players of American football from Cincinnati
Players of Canadian football from Cincinnati
Saskatchewan Roughriders players
American Football League players